Women in War is a 1940 American war film about the nurses of the British Voluntary Aid Detachment during the Battle of France. Directed by John H. Auer and starring Wendy Barrie, Elsie Janis and Patric Knowles, it was nominated for an Oscar for Best Visual Effects (Howard Lydecker, William Bradford, Ellis J. Thackery, Herbert Norsch).

Plot
Socialite Pamela Starr meets Mr Tedford, an older man in a London night club. After he escorts her home he tries to enter her flat feeling he has deserved the right to sleep with her as he has paid for her entertainment. Pamela thrusts a £5 note in his hands as reimbursement and attempts to enter her room but Tedford will not let her. The spirited Pamela strikes the drunken Tedford sending him across the landing where he crashes through a railing over the stairwell sending Tedford to his death.

The ensuing court case does not go well for Pamela as her playgirl lifestyle is paraded as evidence against her, and to Pamela's surprise, Mr. Tedford was actually a British Army captain on leave from the war front. Watching the trial is Matron O'Neil, who was formerly Pamela's mother until she divorced her husband and left to go nursing around the troubled world to help those in need. Pamela had never known her mother and her late libertine father had denied her moral leadership and discipline in raising her. O'Neil and Pamela's defence solicitor concoct an arrangement where Pamela will not be charged with Tedford's death if she volunteers to be an Army nurse in France. Pamela is assigned to a VAD Detachment led by Matron O'Neil with Pamela still unaware that O'Neil is her mother.

Pamela's infamous reputation precedes her and furthermore the fiancée of one of her fellow nurses, Flt. Lt. Larry Hall of the RAF falls in love with Pamela. The tensions of the nurses continue as their detachment is sent to a dangerous area of the battle line.

Cast
 Elsie Janis as Matron O'Neil, formerly Mrs. Starr
 Wendy Barrie as Pamela Starr
 Patric Knowles as Flt Lt. Larry Hall
 Mae Clarke as Gail Halliday
 Dennie Moore as Ginger
 Dorothy Peterson as Sister Frances
 Billy Gilbert as Pierre, the Cobbler
 Colin Tapley as Capt. Tedford, the Masher
 Stanley Logan as Col. Starr
 Barbara Pepper as Millie, Irish Nurse
 Pamela Randell as Phyllis Grant, Nurse
 Lawrence Grant as Sir Gordon, Defense Attorney
 Lester Matthews as Sir Humphrey, Prosecuting attorney
 Holmes Herbert as Chief Justice
 Peter Cushing as Capt. Evans

References

External links

1940 films
1940s war drama films
American war drama films
1940s English-language films
Films directed by John H. Auer
Republic Pictures films
World War II films made in wartime
Western Front of World War II films
American black-and-white films
Films set in London
Films produced by Sol C. Siegel
Films with screenplays by F. Hugh Herbert
1940 drama films